Frank Steadman Hurrey (23 June 1885 – 19 August 1953) was a former Australian rules footballer who played with Melbourne in the Victorian Football League (VFL).

Family
One of four children, and the son of Alfred Clarke Hurrey (1855-1931), and Mary Anna Frances Hurrey (1853-1936), née Newman, Frank Steadman Hurrey was born on 23 June 1885.

He was engaged to a Miss Vera Agnes Patterson in 1913; however, they did not marry — Miss Patterson married a Donald William McKellar in June 1915.

Hurrey remained single for the rest of his life. He died on 19 August 1953.

Football
Recruited by Melbourne from the Burwood Football Club, and selected at half-back flank, he was one of Melbourne's best players (in a team that only had 17 men, due to Ernest Denton's broken jaw in the first quarter) in his first senior game, the last match of the 1905 season, against Carlton on 9 September 1905.

He played two further games: against Essendon on 14 July 1906 (round 10), and against Fitzroy on 25 August 1906 (round 15).

Teacher
A qualified State School teacher, he was a teacher by profession.

Military service
The headmaster of the Emu Creek State School, Mandurang, Hurrey enlisted in the First AIF, at the age of 30, in October 1915. He returned to Australia from his overseas service in July 1918; and, for some time, was operating as a recruiting officer.

Notes

References
 
 Australian Imperial Force: Appointments, Commonwealth of Australia Gazette, No.144, (Thursday, 12 October 1916), p.2948: Appointment of Sergeant Frank Steadman Hurrey as Second Lieutenant (effective 1 October 1916)
 Australian Military Forces: Appointment to Substantive Commissions on the Reserve of Officers, Commonwealth of Australia Gazette, No.144, (Thursday, 17 February 1921), p.322: Appointment of Honorary Lieutenant Frank Steadman Hurrey, in the Reserve of Officers, as Lieutenant in the 3rd Military District (effective 1 October 1920)
 First World War Embarkation Roll: Second Lieutenant Frank Steadman Hurrey (4803), Australian War Museum.
 First World War Nominal Roll: Second Lieutenant Frank Steadman Hurrey (4803), Australian War Museum.
 First World War Service Record: Second Lieutenant Frank Steadman Hurrey (4803), National Archives of Australia.
 Officers of the A.I.F. at Home and Abroad, (Melbourne) Punch, (Thursday, 31 January 1918), p.20.
 Discovering Anzacs: Frank Steadman Hurrey, National Archives of Australia.
 Bottle Attack on Teacher: Skull Fractured, The Argus, (Monday, 23 May 1938), p.3.

External links 

1885 births
1953 deaths
Australian rules footballers from Victoria (Australia)
Melbourne Football Club players
Australian schoolteachers
Australian military personnel of World War I